The Edward H. and Bertha R. Keller House is a house located in northeast Portland, Oregon, in the United States, listed on the National Register of Historic Places.

An early example of the work of Elmer Feig and one of only seven known single-family residences designed by Feig, the house is an English Cottage Revival structure with a steep roof and rolled eaves meant to simulate a thatched roof, punctuated by eyebrow dormer windows. The house is considered the finest example of English Cottage Revival in the Alameda Neighborhood of northeast Portland. Feig estimated construction costs at $23,000.

See also
 National Register of Historic Places listings in Northeast Portland, Oregon

References

1924 establishments in Oregon
Alameda, Portland, Oregon
Houses completed in 1924
Houses on the National Register of Historic Places in Portland, Oregon
Tudor Revival architecture in Oregon